Journey to the Christmas Star is a Norwegian fairy-tale adventure film from 2012 directed by Nils Gaup. The film is based on Sverre Brandt's 1924 play Reisen til Julestjernen and is otherwise considered a remake of the 1976 film with the same name. The film stars Vilde Marie Zeiner, Agnes Kittelsen, and Anders Baasmo Christiansen.

The film was a box-office success, and it was seen by 443,680 people, which made it the fifth-most-viewed film in Norwegian cinemas in 2012 (after The Hobbit: An Unexpected Journey and ahead of The Dark Knight Rises).

The film was rated four stars by Dagbladet, Verdens Gang, Dagsavisen, and FilmMagasinet, and three stars by Aftenposten.

Cast
 Vilde Marie Zeiner as Sonja
 Agnes Kittelsen as Melssahya the witch
 Stig-Werner Moe as Count Uldrich
 Anders Baasmo Christiansen as the king
 Jakob Oftebro as Ole
 Evy Kasseth Røsten as Petrine
 Eilif Hellum Noraker as Mose
 Andreas Cappelen as Santa Claus
 Kristin Zachariassen as Mrs. Claus
 Knut Walle as Father Christmas
 Sofie Asplin as Kristen, the witch's daughter
 Jarl Goli as the astrologer
 Vera Rudi as the robber girl

References

External links 
 
 Norsk filmografi: Reisen til Julestjernen

2012 films
Norwegian Christmas films
2010s Norwegian-language films
Norwegian adventure films
Norwegian children's films
Norwegian films based on plays